USS Greenling (SSN-614) was a . She was the second ship of the United States Navy to be named for the greenling, an elongated, fine-scaled fish found from Kamchatka to California. Her keel was laid down on 15 August 1961 by  General Dynamics Electric Boat of Groton, Connecticut.

On 10 April 1963, Thresher, the lead ship of [[Thresher class submarine|Greenling'''s class]], was lost due to severe design flaws in her non-nuclear piping systems.  Because she was still early in the construction process, Greenling was one of three selected Thresher-class submarines selected for conversion to the "improved Thresher class."  (The other two were SSN-613 Flasher and SSN-615 Gato.) She was launched on 4 April 1964 sponsored by Mrs. H.C. Bruton. On 29 April, she was towed to Quincy, Massachusetts, for lengthening and submarine safety program (SUBSAFE) modifications.  Modifications included increased buoyancy and adding 13 feet 9 inches of length to the hull, providing improved living and working conditions for the crew and space for additional equipment.  Before construction of Greenling was completed, she and her sister ships were redesignated the Permit class, after the eldest surviving member of the class.  Greenling was commissioned on 3 November 1967.

Service history
On 27 May 1968, Greenlings fleet training exercise was interrupted by the search and rescue operation for missing submarine . Her commanding officer was designated the Commander of the SAR Task Element, which included of three nuclear and four diesel submarines. That assignment continued until 12 June 1968.Greenling spent most of her career assigned to Submarine Squadron 10 (SUBRON 10) and was homeported in Groton, Connecticut.

On 27 March 1973, Greenling accidentally dived "well below its test depth" during a training dive off the coast of Bermuda due to a faulty depth gauge. A different gauge revealed the error and the submarine returned to the surface safely. Various reports placed Greenling between 150 and 200 feet from crush depth at her deepest point. After returning to port, she was sent to Portsmouth Naval Shipyard in Maine for examination, and was returned to service soon after.History to 1994 needed.Greenling was decommissioned on 18 April 1994 and was subsequently disposed through the Nuclear Powered Ship and Submarine Recycling Program at Puget Sound Naval Shipyard on 30 September 1994.  Equipment from Greenling''s control room was salvaged and used to construct a simulation of a submarine control room as an exhibit at the Naval Undersea Museum in Keyport, Washington.

References 

 
 USS Greenling website

 

Ships built in Groton, Connecticut
Permit-class submarines
Cold War submarines of the United States
Nuclear submarines of the United States Navy
1964 ships